Ark of the Covenant is an American Christian metalcore band from Connecticut. The band started making music in 2009, and their members are lead vocalist, Alexander Vincelette, lead guitarist, Jacob Johnson, bassist, Daniel Graves, and drummer, Michael Hnath. The band released an extended play, Separation, in 2011 with Strike First Records. Their first studio album, Self Harvest, was released by Facedown Records, in 2013.

Background
Ark of the Covenant is a Christian metal band from Connecticut. Their members are lead vocalist, Alexander Vincelette, guitarists, Jacob Johnson, Greg Thomas and Brad Thibodeaux, bassist, Daniel Graves, and drummer, Michael Hnath.

Music history
The band commenced as a musical entity in 2009, with their first release, Separation, an extended play, that was released by Strike First Records on May 10, 2011. Their first studio album, Self Harvest, was released on April 30, 2013 by Facedown Records.

Members
Current members
 Alexander Vincelette - lead vocals (2009–present)
 Tom - guitar
 Daniel Graves - bass (2009–present)
 Michael Hnath - drums (2009–present)

Former members
 Jacob Johnson - guitar (2009-2011)
 Philip Duchesne - bass, vocals (2009)
 Greg Thomas - guitar, keyboard
 Brad Thibodeaux - guitar

Discography
Studio albums
 Self Harvest (April 30, 2013, Facedown)
EPs
 Separation (May 10, 2011, Strike First)

References

External links
Official website

Heavy metal musical groups from Connecticut
2009 establishments in Connecticut
Musical groups established in 2009
Strike First Records artists
Facedown Records artists
Metalcore musical groups from Connecticut
American Christian metal musical groups